Allan Saxe is an American political scientist, author, lecturer, radio commentator, philanthropist, and professor. A emeritus of political science at the University of Texas at Arlington, where he has been a faculty member since 1965, Saxe has since retired, although he would air on WBAP occasionally.

Early life and education
Saxe was born in Oklahoma City, Oklahoma and earned his Ph.D in political science at the University of Oklahoma in the year 1969. As a child, he was diagnosed with polio and remained bedridden for several months. The case has since affected to where he is incapable of driving a car in his later years.

Publications
Saxe has published one book titled Politics of Arlington, Texas: An Era of Continuity and Growth and co-authored one other titled American Government: A Core Approach. He has also been published in several political journals and magazine articles.

Philanthropy
Saxe's mother left him $500,000 upon her death which he gave away to charitable organizations. He has funded the Christmas lights in downtown Arlington, Texas as well as paid for efforts to keep traffic flowing in the area for light viewing.

Landmarks throughout Arlington, Texas are named after Saxe in honor of his generous giving. These include: Allan Saxe Park, The Allan Saxe Dental Clinic, The Allan Saxe Field, and the Allan Saxe Parkway (the latter a "tongue-in-cheek" honor; the "Parkway" leads to the Arlington city landfill and was named after his critiques of city council actions).

Grants, loans, and charities bear his name. The Allan Saxe NT Green Loan is a loan offered to students of the University of North Texas for unexpected expenses outside of tuition, fees, and books. The Allan Saxe Disabled Student Scholarship is a scholarship for disabled students at the University of Texas at Arlington who excel academically. Additionally, UNT lists The Ruth Brock and Allan Saxe Scholarship in Library Science as an available scholarship for students. Saxe donated $100,000 to have a 50 foot tall sculpture erected between AT&T Stadium and Rangers Ballpark in Arlington.

Honors and awards
Saxe has been given a rating of 4.5 out of 5 on Rate My Professors. He has also received numerous awards for his teaching. In 1972, he was named to the UTA Chancellor's Council Award (formerly the AMOCO Award). In 1986, 2007, and 2008 he was named to the Gertrude Golladay Memorial Award for Outstanding Teaching in the College of Liberal Arts.

References

Year of birth missing (living people)
Living people
Writers from Oklahoma City
University of Oklahoma alumni
University of Texas at Arlington faculty
American political scientists